Gummi Bears may refer to:

 Gummy bear, a soft, chewy candy
 Gummi Bears, the proprietary Disney animated cartoon
 Gummibar, a viral character band

See also
Gummy Bear (disambiguation)